Christian Paul  (born 23 March 1960 in Clermont-Ferrand, Puy-de-Dôme) is a French Socialist politician.

He was one of the founding members of the Nouveau Parti Socialiste (New Socialist Party). Along with Arnaud Montebourg, he left this party to create a new movement within the Socialist party called "Rénover Maintenant" ("Renew Now").

Political Offices
 Deputy for Nièvre in the National Assembly, 3rd constituency from 1997 until its abolition in 2012, then the 2nd, which took over most of the 3rds territory from 2012 to 2017.  He was defeated in the 2nd round of the 2017 election by REM's Patrice Perrot.
 President of the Parc Régional du Morvan in Morvan, France.

Publications 
 Le défi numérique des territoires, Éditions Autrement, 2007.
 Pour la République européenne, in collaboration with Stéphane Collignon, 2008.

References

External links
Official blog 

1960 births
Living people
Sciences Po alumni
École nationale d'administration alumni
Socialist Party (France) politicians
Politicians from Clermont-Ferrand
Deputies of the 12th National Assembly of the French Fifth Republic
Deputies of the 13th National Assembly of the French Fifth Republic
Deputies of the 14th National Assembly of the French Fifth Republic
People from Nièvre